Flute Concerto No. 1 may refer to:

 Flute Concerto No. 1 (Jolivet)
 Flute Concerto No. 1 (Mozart)